Varani is a small town located in the region of Northern Province in Sri Lanka. It is around 196 miles (316 km) North of Colombo, the country's capital.

See also
 List of towns in Northern Province, Sri Lanka

References

External links

Towns in Jaffna District
Thenmarachchi DS Division